Kilgore may refer to:

Fictional characters
 Kilgore Trout, a recurring character in the novels of Kurt Vonnegut
 Lt. Colonel Bill Kilgore, a character in the Francis Ford Coppola movie Apocalypse Now
 Teddybear Kilgore (AKA Kilgour), a character in the John Irving novel A Prayer for Owen Meany
 Eli and Hastings Kilgore, brothers from the Ugly Hill webcomic
 Kilgor, a barbarian king in the computer game Heroes of Might and Magic III: Armageddon's Blade
 Kilg%re, a DC Comics supervillain
 Kilgore, a Killer Instinct character
 Killgore, a character from My Life as a Teenage Robot
 Tacitus Kilgore, a pseudonym for Arthur Morgan from Read Dead Redemption 2

People

In politics
 Constantine B. Kilgore, U.S. Representative from Texas 1887–1895
 Daniel Kilgore, U.S. Representative from Ohio, 1793–1851
 David Kilgore, U.S. Representative from Indiana 1857–1861, grandfather of Bernard Kilgore
 Harley M. Kilgore, U.S. Senator from West Virginia 1941–1956
 Jerry W. Kilgore, Virginia Attorney General 2002–2005
 Larry Kilgore, Texas conservative Christian activist and political candidate
 Moses Kilgore (1817–1890), Wisconsin state legislator
 Terry Kilgore, Virginia state delegate 1994–, twin brother of Jerry W. Kilgore

Other people
 Al Kilgore, cartoonist
 Bernard Kilgore, editor of The Wall Street Journal 1941–1967
 Chad Kilgore, American football player
 Kenneth Kilgore (1947-2011), American musician
 Merl Kilgore, founder of Zion's Order, Inc., a Latter Day Saint sect
 Merle Kilgore, country music singer/songwriter
 Theola Kilgore (1925–2005), American singer
 Tom Kilgore, CEO Tennessee Valley Authority

Places
 Kilgore, Idaho
 Kilgore, Nebraska
 Kilgore, Ohio
 Kilgore, Texas

Other uses
 Kilgore (band), an American heavy metal band formed in Providence, Rhode Island
 Kilgore College
 Kilgore College Rangerettes

See also
 Killgore (disambiguation)